Albrecht von Nürnberg was a medieval Bernese master sculptor originally from Nürnberg. He is first mentioned in 1492 and died some time after 1531 in Bern.

His principal works include the nine-metre wooden Christophorus figure originally installed at the Christoffelturm in Bern (1496–1498) and the baptismal font in the Münster of Bern (1524-1525). With Matthäus Ensinger and Erhard Küng, Albrecht is one of three outstanding Bernese sculptors.

References

 

People from Bern
Swiss sculptors
16th-century deaths
Year of birth unknown
Year of death unknown